Rocca Imperiale is a town and comune in the province of Cosenza in the Calabria region of southern Italy. Rocca Imperiale is located in the middle of the arc that surrounds the Gulf of Taranto and sits 4 km away from the sea on a hill at the foothills of the Apennine Mountains, which stretches out to the shore that was once the ancient Siritide plain.

Main sights include the Castle of Frederick II of Hohenstaufen (Italian: Castello Svevo), Rocca Imperiale  is the name of the town (meaning "imperial rock") the Chiesa Madre, the Monastery, and the wax museum.

Twin towns – sister cities
Rocca Imperiale is twinned with:

  Valenza, Italy

References

Cities and towns in Calabria